Kaysefe is a Turkish dessert made of dried fruits and melted butter. It is a regional specialty of Erzurum. Different fruits may be used including dried apricots or mulberries. First the dried fruit is boiled in water with sugar. Butter is spooned over the boiled fruit and the dessert is garnished with chopped or ground walnuts, pistachios or hazelnuts.

See also
 List of Turkish desserts

References

Turkish desserts
Erzurum